Joseph Andre Nuttall (born 27 January 1997) is an English professional footballer who plays as a striker for Oldham Athletic. He has previously played for Aberdeen, Stranraer, Dumbarton, Blackburn Rovers, Blackpool, Northampton Town and Scunthorpe United.

Career

Manchester City
Nuttall began his career in the Manchester City academy in 2013.

Aberdeen
During the summer of 2015, Aberdeen completed the signing of the then-teenage Nuttall on a two-year deal. A product of the City youth academy, he first spent a spell training with the club at the end of the 2014–15 season. He made his debut for the Dons' U-20s against Dundee United on 1 September 2015. He scored his first goal in the Youth Cup win over Fraserburgh at Pittodrie, and later scored against Inverness Caledonian Thistle.

Nuttall made his professional debut for Aberdeen as an 81st-minute substitute in a league match against Heart of Midlothian on 16 May 2016.

Loan spells

On 10 November 2016, Nuttall moved to Stranraer on a 28-day loan. He scored on his debut for the club in a 3–2 loss to Albion Rovers and then scored again in a 3–1 win against Stenhousemuir. On 6 December 2016, Stranraer extended his loan deal until 18 January. After returning to Aberdeen he joined Dumbarton on 31 March 2017, on an emergency loan until the end of the season. Nuttall's contract expired in May 2017, resulting in his leaving Aberdeen without making any significant impact in the first team.

Blackburn Rovers
On 11 July, Nuttall joined Blackburn Rovers on trial, and played in a pre-season Rovers development team game against Darwen; he scored a hat-trick in a 5–0 Rovers victory. The next week he scored two goals for the Rovers development team against Ramsbottom United. Nuttall made his senior first-team debut coming on as a substitute in the second half of a pre-season game against Morecambe on 21 July 2017. The next day, Blackburn announced he had signed a 12-month contract with an option for a further 12 months.

In August 2017, Nuttall made his first-team debut as a substitute and scored the only goal for Blackburn in a 2017–18 EFL Trophy victory against Stoke City U-21s.

On 31 October, Nuttall made his league debut coming on in the second half against Fleetwood Town and scored again. He also came off the bench in the FA Cup against Barnet and scored, making it three goals in his first four appearances for Rovers.

Premier League 2

After arriving on trial in July, Nuttall went on to contribute 14 goals in 15 appearances and gained two assists. It was after ten goals in seven games midway through October for the development squad that Nuttall was promoted into the first team, before dropping back down into the development squad towards the end of January 2018. On 12 May Nuttall was one of seven players nominated for Premier League 2 Player of the Season. Also on this list were Reiss Nelson, Eddie Nketiah, Lukas Nmecha and Harry Wilson. Also, despite his 13 appearances in the Blackburn first team, Nuttall finished as the Premier League 2's second-top goalscorer with 14 goals, behind Lukas Nmecha's 15 strikes.

2017–18 season

In Nuttall's breakthrough season, the striker went on to make 13 appearances for the Blackburn Rovers first-team squad. In that time, Nuttall scored two goals, the first on his debut against Fleetwood in a 2–2 draw and his second coming three weeks later on 21 November in a 4–2 win over Oxford united. He would go on to make ten more appearances and help Blackburn get promoted back to the Championship at the first time of asking. He also scored three more goals in both league and cup competitions.

Blackpool
On 1 August 2019, Nuttall joined Blackpool for an undisclosed fee. He scored his first goal for Blackpool in an EFL Trophy tie against Morecambe on 3 September 2019 and later scored his first EFL League One goal for Blackpool against Ipswich Town  on 23 November 2019. His second was an injury-time winner, also against Ipswich, at Bloomfield Road on 29 February 2020.

Northampton Town (loan)
Nuttall joined Northampton Town on a season-long loan deal on 31 August 2020, but returned to his parent club in October after making only one substitute appearance against Hull City on account of a knee injury.

Scunthorpe United
On 31 January 2022, Nuttall joined League Two club Scunthorpe United for an undisclosed fee.

Oldham Athletic 
On 9 December 2022, Nuttall joined fellow National League side, Oldham Athletic on a three-year deal.

Career statistics

Honours
Blackburn Rovers
EFL League One runner-up: 2017–18

References

External links
Joe Nutall at Soccerbase

1997 births
Living people
Footballers from Bury, Greater Manchester
English footballers
Association football forwards
Manchester City F.C. players
Aberdeen F.C. players
Stranraer F.C. players
Dumbarton F.C. players
Blackburn Rovers F.C. players
Blackpool F.C. players
Northampton Town F.C. players
Scunthorpe United F.C. players
Oldham Athletic A.F.C. players
Scottish Professional Football League players
English Football League players
National League (English football) players